IMCA may refer to:
 International Marine Contractors Association, a trade association for offshore, marine and underwater engineering companies 
 International Management Centres Association, an unaccredited institution of higher education based in Buckingham, UK.
 International Motor Contest Association, a United States racing sanctioning body
 Islamic Movement of Central Asia, a guerrilla organization
 Investment Management Consultants Association (IMCA), the organization that confers the financial certifications of Certified Investment Management Analyst (CIMA) and Certified Private Wealth Advisor (CPWA)